Pandrosion of Alexandria was a mathematician in fourth-century-AD Alexandria, discussed in the Mathematical Collection of Pappus of Alexandria and known for developing an approximate method for doubling the cube. Although there is disagreement on the subject, Pandrosion is believed by many current scholars to have been female. If so, she would be an earlier female contributor to mathematics than Hypatia.

Contributions
Pandrosion is credited with developing a method for calculating numerically accurate but approximate solutions to the problem of doubling the cube, or more generally of calculating cube roots. It is a "recursive geometric" solution, but three-dimensional rather than working within the plane. Pappus criticized this work as lacking a proper mathematical proof. Although Pappus does not directly state that the method is Pandrosion's, he includes it in a section of his Collection dedicated to correcting what he perceives as errors in Pandrosion's students. Another method included in the same section, and attributable in the same way indirectly to Pandrosion, is a correct and exact method for constructing the geometric mean, simpler than the method used by Pappus.

Gender
When Friedrich Hultsch prepared his 1878 translation of Pappus's Collection from Greek into Latin, the manuscript of the Collection that he used referred to Pandrosion using a feminine form of address. Hultsch decided that this must have been a mistake, and referred to Pandrosion as masculine in his translation; many later scholars have followed suit. However, the 1988 English translation of Pappus by Alexander Raymond Jones "argued convincingly" that the original feminine form was not a mistake, and more recent scholarship has followed Jones in taking the position that Pandrosion was a woman.

Connection to Hypatia
Hypatia has often been called the first woman to have contributed to mathematics, but Pappus died before the earliest suggested birth date of Hypatia. Therefore, Pandrosion is a likely candidate for an earlier female contributor to mathematics than Hypatia. Pandrosion was also described by Pappus as a teacher of mathematics, and although Pappus recorded only men among her students, Edward J. Watts suggests that Hypatia may have known of, or even known, Pandrosion.

References

4th-century Byzantine scientists
4th-century mathematicians
Ancient Greek mathematicians
Women mathematicians
4th-century Byzantine women
4th-century Egyptian women
Ancient women scientists
4th-century BC mathematicians